Tramea is a genus of dragonflies in the family Libellulidae,
the skimmers and perchers. Species of Tramea are found in tropical and subtropical regions around the globe.
They typically have colored bases to their otherwise translucent hindwings. In particular when they fly, this creates the impression of their carrying bags at the start of their abdomens. They are known commonly as saddlebags or saddlebags gliders.

Species
The genus Tramea includes the following species, some of which have subspecies:
Tramea abdominalis  – Vermilion Saddlebags
Tramea aquila 
Tramea basilaris  – Keyhole Glider, Wheeling Glider, Red Marsh Trotter
 Tramea basilaris burmeisteri  
Tramea binotata  – Sooty Saddlebags 
Tramea calverti  – Striped Saddlebags
Tramea carolina  – Carolina Saddlebags
Tramea cophysa 
Tramea eurybia 
Tramea eurybia monticola  
Tramea insularis  – Antillean Saddlebags
Tramea lacerata  – Black Saddlebags 
Tramea liberata 
Tramea liberata lieftincki 
Tramea limbata  – Ferrugineus Glider, Voyaging Glider, Black Marsh Trotter 
Tramea loewii  – Common Glider
Tramea minuta 
Tramea onusta  – Red Saddlebags, Red-mantled Saddlebags
Tramea phaeoneura 
Tramea rosenbergi 
Tramea rustica 
Tramea stenoloba  - Narrow-lobed glider
Tramea transmarina  – Red Glider
 Tramea euryale Selys, 1878
 Tramea transmarina intersecta Lieftinck, 1975
 Tramea propinqua Lieftinck, 1942
 Tramea samoensis Brauer, 1867
Tramea virginia

Gallery
Wing markings of Tramea dragonflies are striking and help distinguish different species.

References

Libellulidae
Anisoptera genera
Odonata of Oceania
Odonata of Africa
Odonata of Asia
Odonata of Australia
Taxa named by Hermann August Hagen
Taxonomy articles created by Polbot